The 2016 Bank of Liuzhou Cup was a professional tennis tournament played on outdoor hard courts. It was the first edition of the tournament and part of the 2016 ITF Women's Circuit, offering a total of $50,000 in prize money. It took place in Liuzhou, China, on 24–30 October 2016.

Singles main draw entrants

Seeds 

 1 Rankings as of 17 October 2016.

Other entrants 
The following player received a wildcard into the singles main draw:
  Lu Jiaxi
  Yuan Chengyiyi
  Zhang Ying

The following players received entry from the qualifying draw:
  Kang Jiaqi
  Sun Ziyue
  Wei Zhanlan
  You Xiaodi

The following player received entry by a special exempt:
  Xu Yifan

Champions

Singles

 Nina Stojanović def.  Jang Su-jeong, 6–3, 6–4

Doubles

 Veronika Kudermetova /  Aleksandra Pospelova def.  Jacqueline Cako /  Sabina Sharipova, 6–2, 6–4

External links 
 2016 Bank of Liuzhou Cup at ITFtennis.com

2016 ITF Women's Circuit
2016 in Chinese tennis
Liuzhou Open